Cezar Mateus (born 1961 in Bucharest, Romania) is an American luthier working in Princeton, New Jersey. He specializes in lutes, archlutes, theorbos and other related instruments. His instruments have been played by Sting, Edin Karamazov, Yasunori Imamura, Roman Turovsky, Ariel Abramovich, Eric Redlinger (of Asteria Musica) and Evangelina Mascardi.

References

External links

Living people
1961 births
American luthiers
Lute makers
Musicians from Bucharest
Composers for lute
21st-century classical composers
People from Princeton, New Jersey
Romanian luthiers
21st-century American musicians
Male classical composers
21st-century American male musicians